Sufianto Salleh is a Singaporean footballer who plays for Home United FC as a defender. He was converted to a defender having played as a striker in his earlier career.

He started playing in the Sleague for Young Lions FC in 2012 before moving to the Home United prime league team in 2014 and was promoted to the Sleague squad in 2016.

Club career

Young Lions FC

Sufianto began his professional football career with Garena Young Lions in the Sleague in 2012.  He played mainly as a striker for 2 years before being released by the team.

Home United
After released by the Young Lions, he joined the Home United academy to play in their prime league squad.  He was later promoted to the main squad in 2015 and was converted to a left back by Philipe Aw.

Career statistics

References

Singaporean footballers
Singapore Premier League players
1993 births
Living people
Association football defenders
Home United FC players
Young Lions FC players
Balestier Khalsa FC players